Silva Island (also De Silva Island) is an island in San Francisco Bay, formerly completely separated from the mainland but now mostly connected. It is in Marin County, California.

References

Islands of Marin County, California
Islands of San Francisco Bay
Islands of Northern California